The 1971–72 season was Cambridge United's 2nd season in the Football League.

Final league table

Results

Legend

Football League Fourth Division

FA Cup

League Cup

Squad statistics

References

 Cambridge 1971–72 at statto.com 
 Player information sourced from The English National Football Archive

Cambridge United F.C. seasons
Cambridge United